The Wiarton Rock was a Canadian Junior ice hockey team based in Wiarton, Ontario, and a member of the Greater Metro Junior A Hockey League (GMHL).  The Rock relocated multiple times, spending time in King City, Nobleton, Lefroy, and Markdale, Ontario.

History

The King Wild's first game was the first game in the GMHL's history taking place on September 8, 2006, against the Richmond Hill Rams in Richmond Hill, Ontario. The Wild lost 6-0 to the Rams despite outshooting them. The Wild's first victory was a 5-1 decision over the Toronto Canada Moose on September 9, 2006. The team's first home game was against the Nipissing Alouettes on September 10, 2006. The Wild were victorious, winning by a 5-3 score.

The 2006–07 finalists started the 2007–08 season off rather slow. After playing poorly for most of the season, the Wild surged in the last quarter with a long winning streak to pull to a .500 record by the final regular season game. In the bye round of the playoffs, all byes had been picked and the final two teams remaining were the Wild and the Douro Dukes who would play in the first round by default. Although the Dukes played well, the Wild swept the series 4-0. The Wild continued to play well against the Temiscaming Royals in the league quarter-finals, but were still defeated by the second-seeded team in six games.

In March 2008, the Wild and the Richmond Hill Rams challenged the Mexico national ice hockey team to a set of four exhibition games. The first of two games for the Wild happened on March 22, as the Wild defeated the Mexican Senior team 7-6 in overtime. On March 25, the Wild beat them again 7-6, this time in regulation.

At the 2010 Summer Annual Governor's Meeting, it was announced that the Wild would relocate to the Vaughan Ice Plex in Vaughan, Ontario, after two seasons in Nobleton and two previous in King City.

In the summer of 2011, the Vaughan Wild moved to Lefroy, Ontario, and became the Lefroy Wave. In the spring of 2014, the Wave moved to Markdale, Ontario, and became the Grey Highlands Bravehearts.  The Bravehearts were the first junior team to be based Markdale since the Junior D Markdale Mohawks played their final season in 1984–85.

After two seasons in Markdale, the Bravehearts moved again to Wiarton, Ontario, for the 2016–17 season where they became the Wiarton Rock. However, the team lasted less than one season in Wiarton and folded on December 14, 2016 after difficulty icing a full team and earning a 1-24-1 record.

On March 20, 2017, the GMHL announced that Wiarton would get another team named the Wiarton Schooners for the 2017–18 season. The new team was primarily owned by John and Beth Dyer, a couple who had formerly been trainers and a billet family for the Rock, and 10% stake by another unannounced owner. After the original announcement by the league, it was indicated the Schooners were an expansion team replacing the Rock and not a direct continuation of the defunct team. However, the Schooners only lasted eight winless games, the last a 25–1 loss to the Knights of Meaford, before also folding.

Season-by-season records

References

External links
Rock website

2006 establishments in Ontario
Ice hockey clubs established in 2006
Ice hockey teams in Ontario
Sport in Simcoe County
Ice hockey clubs disestablished in 2016
2016 disestablishments in Ontario